Terry Davies (1933–2021) was a Welsh international rugby player

Terry or Terence Davies may also refer to:

Terry Davies (cricketer) (born 1960), English cricketer
Terry Davies (rower) (1933–2022), Australian Olympic rower
Terence Davies (born 1945), English screenwriter

See also
Terry Davis (disambiguation)